The Boys in the Boat is an upcoming American drama film directed by George Clooney, based on the non-fiction novel of the same name by Daniel James Brown, starring Callum Turner.

Plot
Joe Rantz, who was cast aside by his family at an early age, abandoned and left to fend for himself in the woods of Washington state, turns to rowing and participates in rowing at the 1936 Summer Olympics – Men's eight.

Cast

 Callum Turner as Joe Rantz
 Joel Edgerton as Al Ulbrickson
 Jack Mulhern    
 Sam Strike
 Peter Guinness as George Yeomans Pocock
 Luke Slattery
 Thomas Elms
 Tom Varey
 Bruce Herbelin-Earle
 Wil Coban
 Sam Bishop
 Ian Kramer
 Luke Roberts
 Joel Phillimore 
 Hadley Robinson
 Courtney Henggeler as Hazel Ulbrickson
 James Wolk as Tom Bolles
 Chris Diamantopoulos as Royal Brougham
 Nick Tajan as German Coxswain
 Jan Stratmann as German Oarsman
 Chris Wilson Hermann Göring

Production

On March 3, 2011, The Weinstein Company acquired the film rights to the novel with Kenneth Branagh set to direct and Donna Gigliotti and Judy Hofflund producing. In October 2018, Lantern Entertainment (the successor of The Weinstein Company) contracted with Metro-Goldwyn-Mayer to distribute the film worldwide. In March 2020, it was announced that George Clooney would direct and produce with Grant Heslov and Mark L. Smith writing the script.

On November 1, 2021, it was announced that Callum Turner would portray Joe Rantz. In February 2022, additional casting was announced, with Joel Edgerton and Hadley Robinson amongst the additions. Courtney Henggeler and James Wolk would join in March, and Chris Diamantopoulos would join in April.

Filming began in March 2022, and was due to take place at Winnersh Film Studios in Berkshire, as well as in Los Angeles and Berlin, nowhere near the still standing original shell house on the University of Washington campus.

References

External links
 

Upcoming films
American sports drama films
Upcoming English-language films
American films based on actual events
Biographical films about sportspeople
Films directed by George Clooney
Metro-Goldwyn-Mayer films
Spyglass Entertainment films
Films shot in Berkshire
Films shot in Berlin
Films shot in Los Angeles
Films about the 1936 Summer Olympics
Films set in Berlin
Films set in Seattle
Films set in 1936